Ben Johnson Mountain (formerly Negro Ben Mountain) is a summit in Jackson County, Oregon, in the United States, with an elevation of .

The mountain was named for Ben Johnson, a local African-American blacksmith. The summit historically was known as Nigger Ben Mountain until the name Negro Ben was officially adopted in 1964.

As of October 24th, 2020 the name has officially been changed by the Oregon Geographic Names Board to his full name Ben Johnson.

References

Mountains of Jackson County, Oregon
Mountains of Oregon